R602 road may refer to:
 R602 road (Ireland)
 R602 road (South Africa)